The 1982 season of the Tongan A Grade was the 9th season of top flight association football competition in Tonga. Ngeleʻia FC won the championship for the first time, their first title in a then-record of 7 consecutive championships. The season began on January 30, 1982 and all matches were played on a Saturday at Mala'e Pangai.

Teams 
 Funga'onetaka
 Halapili
 Halafualeva
 Halamaumau Koula
 Lataki FC
 'Atenisi United
 Kolofoʻou
 Kolomotu'a
 Ma'ufanga
 Nuku'alofa Strikers
 Ngeleʻia FC
 'Utulau FC
 Veitongo FC

References 

1982
1982 in Tongan sport